Łukasz Kubik (born 2 April 1978 in Kraków) is a Polish retired footballer. His brother, Arkadiusz, is also a professional footballer currently playing Dąb Paszkówka.

References
 
 
 

1978 births
Living people
Polish footballers
MKS Cracovia (football) players
K.V. Mechelen players
Royal Excel Mouscron players
FC Argeș Pitești players
Expatriate footballers in Romania
Levadiakos F.C. players
Jagiellonia Białystok players
Lechia Gdańsk players
Odra Opole players
Association football midfielders
Liga I players
Footballers from Kraków
Polish expatriate sportspeople in Romania
K.R.C. Zuid-West-Vlaanderen players